Staryya Vasilishki (Starye Vasilishki, literally: "Old Vasilishki") is a village in Vasilishki Selsoviet, Shchuchyn district, Hrodna Voblast,  Belarus.

History

In 1919–1939, Stare Wasiliszki were part of Grodno powiat, Białystok Voivodeship, Poland.

Notable people
Polish singer Czesław Niemen was  born in the village in 1939. His family home was turned into a museum.

See also
Vasilishki

References

Villages in Belarus
Populated places in Grodno Region
Nowogródek Voivodeship (1919–1939)